Leptophobia gonzaga, the Gonzaga white, is a butterfly in the  family Pieridae. It is found in Colombia and Ecuador.

References

Pierini
Butterflies described in 1908